Andrew Mills (born 18 June 1981) is an Australian rules footballer who played for Richmond in the Australian Football League (AFL) in 2004 and 2005.

He was drafted from the Murray Bushrangers in the TAC Cup, with the 52nd selection in the 1999 AFL Draft.  He played 14 games in four seasons at the Tigers before he was delisted at the end of the 2003 season.

References

External links

Living people
1981 births
Richmond Football Club players
Murray Bushrangers players
Australian rules footballers from Victoria (Australia)